Raymond Mears is a former association football player who represented New Zealand at international level.

Mears scored on his full All Whites debut in a 3–5 loss to Australia on 25 November 1967 and ended his international playing career with 10 A-international caps and 3 goals to his credit, his final cap an appearance in a 0–2 loss to Israel on 1 October 1969.

References

External links

Year of birth missing (living people)
Living people
New Zealand association footballers
New Zealand international footballers

Association footballers not categorized by position